The facial muscles are a group of striated skeletal muscles supplied by the facial nerve (cranial nerve VII) that, among other things, control facial expression.  These muscles are also called mimetic muscles. They are only found in mammals, although they derive from neural crest cells found in all vertebrates. They are the only muscles that attach to the dermis.

Structure
The facial muscles are just under the skin (subcutaneous) muscles that control facial expression.  They generally originate from the surface of the skull bone (rarely the fascia), and insert on the skin of the face. When they contract, the skin moves. These muscles also cause wrinkles at right angles to the muscles’ action line.

Nerve supply
The facial muscles are supplied by the facial nerve (cranial nerve VII), with each nerve serving one side of the face.  In contrast, the nearby masticatory muscles are supplied by the mandibular nerve, a branch of the trigeminal nerve (cranial nerve V).

List of muscles
The facial muscles include:
 Occipitofrontalis muscle
 Temporoparietalis muscle
 Procerus muscle
 Nasalis muscle
 Depressor septi nasi muscle
 Orbicularis oculi muscle
 Corrugator supercilii muscle
 Depressor supercilii muscle
 Auricular muscles (anterior, superior and posterior)
 Orbicularis oris muscle
 Depressor anguli oris muscle
 Risorius
 Zygomaticus major muscle
 Zygomaticus minor muscle
 Levator labii superioris
 Levator labii superioris alaeque nasi muscle
 Depressor labii inferioris muscle
 Levator anguli oris
 Buccinator muscle
 Mentalis

The platysma is supplied by the facial nerve. Although it is mostly in the neck and can be grouped with the neck muscles by location, it can be considered a muscle of facial expression due to its common nerve supply.

The stylohyoid muscle, stapedius and posterior belly of the digastric muscle are also supplied by the facial nerve, but are not considered muscles of facial expression.

Development
The facial muscles are derived from the second branchial/pharyngeal arch. They, like the branchial arches, originally derive from neural crest cells. In humans, they typically begin forming around the eighth week of embryonic development.

Clinical significance
An inability to form facial expressions on one side of the face may be the first sign of damage to the nerve of these muscles. Damage to the facial nerve results in facial paralysis of the muscles of facial expression on the involved side. Paralysis is the loss of voluntary muscle action; the facial nerve has become damaged permanently or temporarily. This damage can occur with a stroke, Bell palsy, or parotid salivary gland cancer (malignant neoplasm) because the facial nerve travels through the gland. The parotid gland can also be damaged permanently by surgery or temporarily by trauma. These situations of paralysis not only inhibit facial expression but also seriously impair the patient’s ability to speak, either permanently or temporarily.

See also

 Masticatory muscles
 Facial Action Coding System
 Modiolus

References

External links
 ARTNATOMY: Anatomical Basis of Facial Expression Learning Tool
 
 Facial muscles at PracticeAnatomy

 
Muscles of the head and neck
Muscles